Bohdan Wodiczko (2 July 1911, in Warsaw – 12 May 1985, in Warsaw) was a Polish conductor and music teacher.

Early life and education
Born July 1, 1911 in Warsaw, Wodiczko first studied violin at the Warsaw Frederick Chopin Music School and then piano, French horn and theory at the Warsaw Conservatory from 1929. In 1932, he went to Prague for a further training under Jaroslav Křička (composition) and Metod Doležil (conducting) and to attend Václav Talich's special conducting course. Upon his return to Poland three years later, he continued composition studies under Piotr Rytel, he was conducting under Walerian Bierdiajew at the Warsaw Conservatory from 1936-9, and graduated with honours.

Career
During World War II, Wodiczko earned money by playing in the orchestra of the Warsaw Adria night club. After the war he organized the police symphony orchestra in Otwock near Warsaw and was its conductor for a while; he also taught conducting at the Karol Kurpiński Music School in Warsaw. He then moved to Gdańsk where he became the first conductor of the Filharmonia Bałtycka (1946–50), starting from 1947 he would also lecture at the National Higher School of Music in Sopot. From 1947 to 1949, he was also the music director of the Polish Radio in Gdańsk. In 1950, he was appointed artistic manager and first conductor of the National Philharmonic in Lodz and joined the faculty of the Łódź National Higher Music School. From 1951, he worked on counterpart positions at the National Philharmonic in Cracow, and as a lecturer at Cracow's National Higher Music School from 1953. As the artistic manager and first conductor of the National Philharmonic in Warsaw in 1955-8, he took its orchestra on its first grand tour in UK, Belgium and West Germany; he concurrently lectured conducting at the National Higher Music Schools in Warsaw and Poznań and, from 1959, also in Łódź, where he was also the acting conductor of the National Operetta.

During his appointment as conductor of the Reykjavik Philharmonic in 1960, Wodiczko conducted works by Stanisław Moniuszko, Frederic Chopin and Mieczysław Karłowicz, and was instrumental in the production of a complete radio broadcast of Stanislaw Moniuszko's opera Halka. The years 1961-5 saw him produce a number of performances at the Warsaw Opera in his capacity as artistic director and first conductor. The premiere of Igor Stravinsky's Oedipus Rex (staged by Konrad Swinarski) in January 1962 was followed by Stravinsky's Persephone, Orpheus and The Rite of Spring, Giuseppe Verdi's Don Carlos, Stanislaw Moniuszko's The Haunted Manor, Richard Strauss's The Knight of the Rose, Bela Bartok's Bluebeard's Castle, Luigi Dallapiccoli's Il prigionero and Luigi Nono's Il mantello rosso.

In 1965-68, Wodiczko was again conductor at the Reykjavik Philharmonic and in 1968 took the position of conductor of the Polish Radio Great Symphony Orchestra - WOSPR [later NOSPR].

1972-death
A professor at the National Higher Music School in Warsaw in 1972-8, he was appointed director and artistic manager of the Teatr Wielki in Lodz in August 1977 and was the artistic manager, though not the director any more, from April to June 1979. In the last years of his life, when he seldom stood at the conductor's podium, he made the Helsinki recording of Claude Debussy's Iberia and of Karol Szymanowski's Harnasie (with the Polish Radio Great Symphony Orchestra).

Wodiczko received the Order of the Falcon from the President of Iceland in 1968 and the award of the Polish Composers' Association in 1975.

Personal life
He was the father of the Polish-American artist Krzysztof Wodiczko.

Footnotes

References 
 Bohdan Wodiczko at culture.pl

External links

Polish conductors (music)
Male conductors (music)
Chopin University of Music alumni
Polish people of Czech descent
Musicians from Warsaw
1911 births
1985 deaths
20th-century conductors (music)
20th-century male musicians